Fly Girl(s) or Flygirl may refer to:

 Fly Girls (dance troupe), dance troupe from the television series In Living Color
 "Fly Girl" (Kulcha song), 1994
 "Fly Girl" (Queen Latifah song), 1991
 Fly Girls (TV series), a 2010 reality television series on The CW network
 Swedish Fly Girls, a 1971 sex comedy film
 Vernice "Flygirl" Armour, the first African-American female naval combat pilot.
 "A Fly Girl", 1985 rap hit by New York hip-hop group Boogie Boys

Characters
 Flygirl (Archie Comics), a super hero character in Archie Comics
 Fly Girl, an alias of the fictional character Lauren Cooper
 Flygirl (Malibu Comics), an Ultraverse character

See also
 "B-Boys & Flygirls", song on the 1999 Bomfunk MC's album In Stereo